Barbara Thompson is a British figure skater who competed in ice dance.

With partner Gerard Rigby, she won the bronze medal at the 1956 World Figure Skating Championships.

Competitive highlights 
With Gerard Rigby

References 

British female ice dancers
Living people
Year of birth missing (living people)